Himmatnagar Junction railway station is a small railway station in Sabarkantha district, Gujarat. Its code is HMT. It serves Himatnagar city. The station consists of two platforms. The platform is not well sheltered and lacks many facilities including water and sanitation.

Trains

 19703/04 Asarva–Udaipur City Intercity Express
 79401/02 Asarva–Himmatnagar DEMU
 09543/44 Asarva–Dungarpur DEMU
 12981/82 Asarva-Jaipur SF Express
 10821/22 Asarva-Kota Express
 19329/30 Veer Bhumi Chittaurgarh Express(Asarva-Indore)

The newly built station was inaugurated on 13 September 2019 by Indian parliamentarian Dipsinh Rathod. After a month, a DEMU trains running between Himmatnagar and Asarva Junction railway stations were started.

References 

Ahmedabad railway division
Railway stations in Sabarkantha district